The year 687 BC was a year of the pre-Julian Roman calendar. In the Roman Empire, it was known as year 67 Ab urbe condita . The denomination 687 BC for this year has been used since the early medieval period, when the Anno Domini calendar era became the prevalent method in Europe for naming years.

Events

By place

Middle East 
 Gyges becomes king of Lydia.
 Hezekiah succeeded by Manasseh as king of Judah.

Births

Deaths 
 Hezekiah, king of Judah

References